Clarks Cave is a cave in Bath County, Virginia. The cave was mined for saltpeter in the 1800s.

References

Caves of Virginia
Landforms of Bath County, Virginia